Trogloconcha ohashii is a species of sea snail, a marine gastropod mollusk in the family Larocheidae.

Description

Distribution

References

 Kase T. & Kano Y. 2002. Trogloconcha, a new genus of larocheine Scissurellidae (Gastropoda: Vetigastropoda) from tropical Indo-Pacific submarine caves. The Veliger 45(1): 25–32
 Bouchet, P.; Fontaine, B. (2009). List of new marine species described between 2002-2006. Census of Marine Life.

External links

Larocheidae
Gastropods described in 2002